Jinzhai County, previously Lihuang County (named after Wei Lihuang), is a county in the west of Anhui Province, People's Republic of China, bordering the provinces of Henan to the northwest and Hubei to the southwest. The government of Jinzhai County was in Meishan Town before 2006 when it relocated to nearby Jiangdian Town. The county has jurisdiction over nine towns and ten townships.

Jinzhai County is known as "the cradle of generals" as 59 men from the area have reached that rank in the People's Liberation Army (PLA).

Geography
Jinzhai County lies on the joint border of Anhui, Henan and Hubei Provinces.

The county is served by the Hewu Railway.

Climate

Administrative divisions
In the present, Jinzhai County has 11 towns and 12 townships.
11 Towns

12 Townships

References

 
County-level divisions of Anhui
Lu'an